Free Spirit is a 1951  Argentine drama film directed and written by Edmundo del Solar. The film premiered on 9 July 1951 in Buenos Aires.

The film starred Juan Corona, María de la Fuente, Pilar Gómez, Iván Grondona and Josefina Ríos. Director Edmundo del Solar also appeared in the film.

External links
 

1951 films
Argentine black-and-white films
1950s Spanish-language films
Argentine drama films
1951 drama films
1950s Argentine films